Alatuncusia subductalis is a moth in the family Crambidae. It is found in Venezuela.

References

Moths described in 1865
Dichogamini
Moths of South America